The Great Wall Voleex C30 is a subcompact car manufactured by the Chinese company Great Wall Motors from 2010 to 2016. It has only been produced as a four-door sedan.

Overview
An EV version was available for the 2017 model year.

Great Wall announced that 100,000 units had been produced by March 2011, only ten months after production had started. The Voleex C30 was awarded the title of "2010 CCTV Compact Passenger Car of the Year in China".

It has been sold by the Bulgarian company Litex Motors starting from 2013. Other markets where it has been exported include Chile, Peru, Ecuador, Colombia, Ukraine, and South Africa.

The Bulgarian version is available in two trim levels: One and Star, both fitted with manual transmission and the 1.5-lite engine, which produces .

Safety
It scored five stars in a crash test performed by China-NCAP in February 2011, and the model received certification for marketing within the European Union in December 2011.

References

External links
Official website

C-NCAP superminis
Voleex C30
Cars introduced in 2010
2010s cars
Cars of China